Silvi is an Italian comune in the province of Teramo, about  north of Pescara, in the Abruzzo region of central Italy. It stretches from Silvi Marina, a small seaside resort on the Adriatic Coast, to Silvi Paese up in the hills.

History

Silvi is closely tied to Atri's history, being only a short distance away.  In the 13th and 14th centuries Silvi was a main cog of a coastal defense system based on day and night signals through fires and smoke to alert the government in Naples of the frequent landings of Turks and pirates. Through a series of mirrors, fire and smoke signals, these coastal defenses could relay information that could be received in Naples (capital of the Kingdom) in mere hours.

In the 14th century the medieval borough of Castrum Silvi, as it was known, became a fiefdom of the abbey of San Giovanni in Venere (located kilometers away, in what is now the province of Chieti), then passed to the jurisdiction of the Acquaviva family of Atri. At the time Silvi Marina was a small poor port of fishermen. Silvi remained a fiefdom of Atri until the arrival of Napoleon in Italy, who abolished feudalism in 1806.

By 1863 the building of the coastal railway and the station at the coast helped the development of the "Marina" part of Silvi, which little by little took over the government and administration, thanks mostly to investments in the tourist sector. In 1931 the municipal seat was moved from Silvi Paese to Silvi Marina, which within a few years turned into an important seaside resort, becoming the administrative center of all the territory, from the coast to the surrounding hills.

Main sights
Church of San Salvatore, in Silvi Paese, with a bell-tower, dating from the 13th century 
Torre di Cerrano at the ancient harbor of Atri and Silvi. Located on the beach between Silvi Marina and Pineto, it was developed when Atri abandoned the Vomano harbor.  It is named for the Fosso Cerrano, a gully which runs along the sides of the hill down towards the sea. It served as a watch tower for Turkish invaders.  Today the tower houses a marine biology station for the central Adriatic area
Fashionable villas of the late 19th to early 20th centuries after the railroad was developed

Culture
Fosso Concio, which was known as "Concio della Liquirizia" (from the word "acconciare" which means prepare in Abruzzese dialect) because it was here where the roots of the plant, which grew wild and copiously along the hillsides of the Piomba and the Vomano Rivers, were harvested gives rise to its licorice manufacturing industry - known throughout Italy and Europe - with Saila Liquirizia (now part of LEAF Italia spa) and products of Aurelio Menozzi & De Rosa Company. Licorice root has been popular in the Abruzzo region for centuries.

Twin towns
 Memmingen, Germany

References

See also
Italy

Cities and towns in Abruzzo